Willamulka is a locality at the top of Yorke Peninsula in South Australia. It is on the road and  former railway line between Kadina and Bute. Its name is derived from an Aboriginal word meaning "shiny green stone" (copper ore).

The Willamulka Bible Christian church opened on 21 December 1885 and became a Methodist church in 1901. It closed in May 1977 and is located on the corner of Willamulka and Church Roads, east of the modern boundary of the locality.

References

Towns in South Australia